Frederick John Moore (25 June 1890 – 7 October 1971) was an Australian rules football player at the Fitzroy Football Club in the Victorian Football League (VFL). He became a premiership player at Fitroy, playing in the 1916 VFL Grand Final, under the captaincy of Wally Johnson, with George Holden as coach. Moore made his debut against  in Round 8 of the 1916 VFL season, at the Punt Road Oval.

In 1920 Moore began playing for Brunswick Football Club in the VFA and in 1922 he played a then record fifty consecutive games for the club.

References

External links
 
 
 Fred Moore's playing statistics from The VFA Project

1890 births
1971 deaths
Northcote Football Club players
Fitzroy Football Club players
Fitzroy Football Club Premiership players
Brunswick Football Club players
Australian rules footballers from Melbourne
One-time VFL/AFL Premiership players
People from Williamstown, Victoria